Lewiston High School may refer to:

 Lewiston High School (Idaho)
 Lewiston High School (Maine)